José Luis Jerez Cerna (born 26 June 1978) is a Chilean former professional football midfielder. In his prime, Jerez was known for his explosiveness and ball skills.

Club career

Chile
Jerez began his career with Chilean club Unión Española. He debuted for Unión Española in 1996. During the 1998 season, Jerez was loaned out to Primera B club Ñublense. He returned the following season to Unión Española where he spent the next six years appearing in 146 games and scoring 30 goals and winning the 2005 Apertura Championship.

In January 2006, Jerez joined Chile's most successful club, Colo-Colo, which was then coached by Claudio Borghi. In his time with Colo-Colo, Jerez won three championships.

Greece
In summer 2007, Jerez joined Ethnikos Piraeus F.C. and immediately became a key player for the club, making 27 starts (29 total appearances) and scoring 6 goals in his first season.

In July 2008 Ethnikos sold Jerez to newly promoted Greek Super League side Panserraikos.

Jerez made just seven league appearances for Panserraikos, and in January 2009 he returned to Ethnikos Piraeus.

Return to Chile
In January 2010, Jerez signed for Cobreloa. His last club was Deportes La Serena in 2012.

International career
He made an appearance for the Chile national team in 2003 in a friendly match versus China.

Post-retirement
After his retirement, he graduated as a football manager and has played football at amateur level in clubs such as Club Deportivo Jadrán. As a football coach, he has worked in the Unión Española youth ranks and other academies.

In 2021, he emigrated to New York, United States, looking for some opportunities in football coaching. He was supported by his former fellow footballer Omar Riquelme and has worked as a painter.

Honours

Club
Unión Española
Primera División de Chile (1): 2005 Apertura

 Colo-Colo
Primera División de Chile (3): 2006 Apertura, 2006 Clausura, 2007 Apertura

References

External links
 
 
 José Luis Jerez at PlaymakerStats

1978 births
Living people
Footballers from Santiago
Chilean footballers
Chilean expatriate footballers
Chile international footballers
Unión Española footballers
Ñublense footballers
Colo-Colo footballers
Ethnikos Piraeus F.C. players
Panserraikos F.C. players
Cobreloa footballers
Deportes La Serena footballers
Chilean Primera División players
Primera B de Chile players
Football League (Greece) players
Super League Greece players
Chilean expatriate sportspeople in Greece
Expatriate footballers in Greece
Association football midfielders
Chilean football managers